This is a list of settlements in Cluj County, Romania.

The following are the county's cities and sole town (Huedin), along with their attached villages: 

The following are the county's communes, with component villages: